Jackson Township is one of the seventeen townships of Hancock County, Ohio, United States. As of the 2010 census the population was 1,065.

Geography
Located in the central part of the county, it borders the following townships:
Marion Township - north
Amanda Township - east
Delaware Township - southeast
Madison Township - southwest
Eagle Township - west
Liberty Township - northwest corner

No municipalities are located in Jackson Township.

Name and history
It is one of thirty-seven Jackson Townships statewide.

Jackson Township was organized in 1829 and named for Andrew Jackson, who had been elected President of the United States the previous year.

Government
The township is governed by a three-member board of trustees, who are elected in November of odd-numbered years to a four-year term beginning on the following January 1. Two are elected in the year after the presidential election and one is elected in the year before it. There is also an elected township fiscal officer, who serves a four-year term beginning on April 1 of the year after the election, which is held in November of the year before the presidential election. Vacancies in the fiscal officership or on the board of trustees are filled by the remaining trustees.

References

External links

Townships in Hancock County, Ohio
Townships in Ohio